The California kingsnake (Lampropeltis californiae) is a nonvenomous colubrid snake endemic to the western United States and northern Mexico, and is found in a variety of habitats. Due to ease of care and a wide range of color variations, the California kingsnake is one of the most popular snakes in captivity.

Description 
The California kingsnake is on average 2.5 to 3.5 feet long (76 – 107 cm) though they can grow larger; California kingsnakes on Islas Angel de la Guarda, Baja California, Mexico, have been documented growing to 78 inches (2 m). A wide range of color morphs exist in the wild; they are usually found with alternating dark and light bands ranging in color from black and white to brown and cream. Some populations may have longitudinal stripes instead of bands.

Range and habitat 
This species lives in a wide variety of habitats, including woodland chaparral, grassland, deserts, marshes, and even suburban areas. These snakes live in Oregon, California, Nevada, Utah, Arizona, southwestern Colorado, northwestern New Mexico, and northwestern Mexico. In Arizona, they intergrade with the desert kingsnake (Lampropeltis splendida) and the Mexican black kingsnake (Lampropeltis getula nigrita). The species has also become invasive on the Spanish island of Gran Canaria.

Behavior 

The California kingsnake is a cathemeral species of snake; they may be active day or night depending on ambient temperatures. During colder months they retreat underground and enter a hibernation-like state called brumation. When disturbed, California kingsnakes will often coil their bodies to hide their heads, hiss, and rattle their tails, which can produce a sound somewhat resembling that of a rattlesnake. When they are nervous they tend to twitch their tails. They are considered harmless to humans, but if handled it is common for this species to bite, as well as excrete musk and fecal contents from their cloaca.

Diet 
California kingsnakes are opportunistic feeders and common food items include rodents, birds, other reptiles and amphibians. The "king" in their name refers to their propensity to hunt and eat other snakes, including venomous rattlesnakes; California kingsnakes are naturally resistant to the venom of rattlesnakes. California kingsnakes are non-venomous and kill prey by constriction; they are the strongest constrictors proportionate to body size of any snakes. This adaptation may have evolved in response to the kingsnake's preferred reptilian prey, which needs less oxygen to survive an attack by constriction than mammalian prey items.

Reproduction 
The California kingsnake is an oviparous internal fertilization animal, meaning it lays eggs, as opposed to giving live birth like some other snakes.  Courtship for this kingsnake begins in the spring usually sometime after their hibernation or first shedding and involves the males competing for available females. In order to assert dominance when fighting another male, the California Kingsnake will get onto the other male and proceed biting the other snake. Their mating ritual begins by the male snake vibrating uncontrollably. Eggs are laid between May and August, which is generally 42–63 days after mating; in preparation the female will have chosen a suitable location. The typical clutch size is five to 12 eggs with an average of nine, though clutches of 20 or more eggs are known. The hatchlings usually emerge another 40–65 days later and are approximately eight to 13 inches in length. Adult California kingsnakes are most commonly 2.5–3.5 feet in length, and rarely exceed four feet.

In captivity 

The California kingsnake is one of the most popular pet reptiles due to its ease of care, attractive appearance and docile demeanor. Due to natural color and pattern variability between individual snakes, snake enthusiasts have selectively bred for a variety of color patterns known as "morphs". Wild-type California kingsnakes are technically illegal to sell without special permits in their home state of California. These increased restrictions are due to a law that prohibits sale of native California species within state lines; albino morphs are exempt from this law. The law is loosely enforced.

References

External links 

 Lampropeltis californiae – California Kingsnake – information and photos of wild snakes.
 California Kingsnake – information on captive care.
 DesertUSA: Common Kingsnake – information about wild common kingsnakes.
 Control of the invasive alien species Lampropeltis getula californiae on the island of Gran Canaria (Spain).
 California Kingsnake Care Sheet REPTILES magazine

Fauna of California
Lampropeltis
Reptiles of the United States
Reptiles of the Canary Islands